Ernest H. Bjorkman (December 18, 1881 – September 16, 1912) was a United States Navy sailor and a recipient of the United States military's highest decoration, the Medal of Honor.

Biography
Bjorkman was born December 18, 1881, in Malmö, Sweden and after immigrating to the United States joined the Navy. On January 21, 1903, he was serving as an  ordinary seaman aboard the  when it was returning from Puerto Rico and it foundered near Block Island in a heavy fog. For his actions during the wreck he received the Medal of Honor December 26, 1903.

He died on September 16, 1912, and is buried in Crown Hill Cemetery in Wheat Ridge, Colorado. His grave can be found in block 26, lot 122, space 9.

Medal of Honor citation
Rank and organization: Ordinary Seaman, U.S. Navy. Born: 25 April 1881, Malmo, Sweden. Accredited to: New York. G.O. No.: 145, 26 December 1903.

Citation:

On board the U.S.S. Leyden, 21 January 1903, Bjorkman displayed heroism at the time of the wreck of that vessel.

See also

List of Medal of Honor recipients in non-combat incidents

References

External links
 

1881 births
1912 deaths
United States Navy sailors
United States Navy Medal of Honor recipients
Burials in Colorado
American military personnel of the Spanish–American War
Foreign-born Medal of Honor recipients
Swedish emigrants to the United States
Non-combat recipients of the Medal of Honor